Rue Mouffetard is a street in the 5th arrondissement of Paris, France.

Situated in the fifth (cinquième) arrondissement of Paris, Rue Mouffetard is one of Paris's oldest and liveliest neighbourhoods. These days the area has many restaurants, shops, and cafés, and a regular open market.  It is centered on the Place de la Contrescarpe, at the junction of the rue Mouffetard and the rue de Lacepede. Its southern terminus is at the Square Saint-Médard where there is a permanent open-air market.  At its northern terminus, it becomes the rue Descartes at the crossing of the rue Thouin.  It is closed to normal motor traffic much of the week, and is predominantly a pedestrian avenue.

Origin of the name
The rue Mouffetard runs along a flank of the mont Sainte-Geneviève hill that was called "mont Cétarius" or "mont Cetardus" from Roman times; many historians consider "Mouffetard" to be a derivation of this early name. Over the centuries the rue Mouffetard has appeared as rue Montfétard, Maufetard, Mofetard, Moufetard, Mouflard, Moufetard, Moftard, Mostard, and also rue Saint-Marcel, rue du Faubourg Saint-Marceau ("street of the suburb Saint-Marceau") and rue de la Vieille Ville Saint-Marcel ("old town Saint-Marcel street").

History 
The origins of this thoroughfare are ancient, dating back to Neolithic times. As with today's rue Galande, rue Lagrange, rue de la Montagne Sainte-Geneviève and rue Descartes, it was a Roman road running from the Roman Rive Gauche city south to Italy.

From the Middle Ages a church along this section of roadway became centre of a "bourg Saint-Médard" (Saint-Médard village), and from 1724 was integrated into Paris as the main artery of the "Faubourg Saint Médard".

The Diderot family moved at #6 rue Mouffetard in April 1746, where lived also François-Jacques Guillotte, a police officer who wrote an article (Pont militaire) for the Encyclopédie by Diderot.

The area remained relatively unchanged because of its location on the Montagne Sainte-Geneviève, which protected it from Baron Haussmann's redevelopment during the reign of Napoleon III.

Cultural references
 In 1910 Alexander Bogdanov delivered a lecture about Empiriomonism.
 Lenin replied quoting his own Materialism and Empiriocriticism in response.
 At the beginning of Chapter IV of The Sun Also Rises (1926), Ernest Hemingway describes a taxicab heading down the Rue Mouffetard from the Place Contrescarpe.
 The area and the street featured prominently in Krzysztof Kieślowski's Trois Couleurs: Bleu (1992), and stands as the central locale and 'character' in Agnès Varda's L'opéra-mouffe (1958).
 The iconic Henri Cartier-Bresson photograph Rue Mouffetard was taken on this street in 1954.

References

Mouffetard, rue
Pedestrian streets in France